Thomas Smales (birth registered first ¼ ) is an English former professional rugby league footballer who played in the 1950s and 1960s, and coached in the 1970s and 1980s.

Background
Smales' birth was registered in Pontefract district, West Riding of Yorkshire, England.

He is the father of the rugby league footballer; Ian Smales.

Playing career
Smales made his début for Wigan in the 46–5 victory over Featherstone Rovers at Central Park, Wigan on Saturday 20 September 1958, he scored his first try (2-tries) for Wigan in the 23–16 victory over Rochdale Hornets at Athletic Ground, Rochdale on Saturday 4 October 1958, he scored his last try for Wigan in the 16–14 victory over Swinton at Station Road, Swinton on Saturday 23 April 1960, and he played his last match for Wigan in the 17–23 defeat by Hunslet at Central Park, Wigan on Saturday 10 September 1960, and made his début for Featherstone Rovers on Saturday 23 August 1952.

After a period spent playing for Barrow, Smales then played for Featherstone Rovers (Heritage № 456). He played , and scored 3-goals in Featherstone Rovers' 12–25 defeat by Hull Kingston Rovers in the 1966–67 Yorkshire County Cup Final during the 1966–67 season at Headingley Rugby Stadium, Leeds on Saturday 15 October 1966. Smales played , scored a try, two conversion's, and a penalty, in Featherstone Rovers' 17–12 victory over Barrow in the 1966–67 Challenge Cup Final during the 1966–67 season at Wembley Stadium, London on Saturday 13 May 1967, in front of a crowd of 76,290. He played  in Featherstone Rovers' 9–12 defeat by Hull F.C. in the 1969–70 Yorkshire County Cup Final during the 1969–70 season at Headingley Rugby Stadium, Leeds on Saturday 20 September 1969.

Coaching career
During the 1972–73 Northern Rugby Football League season Smales was the coach in Dewsbury's 22–13 victory over Leeds in the Championship Final at Odsal Stadium, Bradford on Saturday 19 May 1973. Smales was the coach of Batley from June 1979 to October 1981.

References

External links
Statistics at wigan.rlfans.com
Wigan RL History – 1958–59 Season at wigan.rlfans.com
Wigan RL History – 1959–60 Season at wigan.rlfans.com
Wigan RL History – 1960–61 Season at wigan.rlfans.com
To date Batley and Dewsbury have met 199 times…
Wembley trip makes top double for faithful
Rogers receives late call-up
Rogers receives late call-up
Fax banking on Tommy's magic.
(archived by web.archive.org) Barrow RL class of '67 set to gather
(archived by web.archive.org) Reunion for class of '67
Playing at Smales pace sank champions
Pain of defeat serves Dewsbury well to prevent any repeat performance
Search for "Tommy Smales" at britishnewspaperarchive.co.uk
Search for "Tom Smales" at britishnewspaperarchive.co.uk
Search for "Thomas Smales" at britishnewspaperarchive.co.uk

1939 births
Living people
Barrow Raiders players
Batley Bulldogs coaches
Bramley R.L.F.C. coaches
Dewsbury Rams coaches
Doncaster R.L.F.C. coaches
English rugby league coaches
English rugby league players
Featherstone Rovers coaches
Featherstone Rovers players
Rugby league locks
Rugby league players from Pontefract
Wigan Warriors players